Joan the Maid is a two-part 1994 French historical film directed by Jacques Rivette. It chronicles the life of Joan of Arc from the French perspective.

This film was released in two parts:  Joan the Maid, Part 1: The Battles and Joan the Maid, Part 2: The Prisons.

Cast
Sandrine Bonnaire as Jeanne d'Arc (Joan of Arc) 
Édith Scob as Jeanne de Béthune
Tatiana Moukhine as Isabelle Romée 
Jean-Marie Richier as Durand Laxart 
Baptiste Roussillon as Baudricourt 
Jean-Luc Petit as Henri Le Royer 
Bernadette Giraud as Catherine Le Royer 
Jean-Claude Jay as Jacques Alain 
Olivier Cruveiller as Jean de Metz 
Benjamin Rataud as Bertrand de Poulengy
André Marcon as Charles, Dauphin of France
Jean-Louis Richard as La Trémoille
Marcel Bozonnet as Regnault de Chartres
Patrick Le Mauff as Jean Bâtard d'Orléans
Didier Sauvegrain as Raoul de Gaucourt
Jean-Pierre Lorit as Jean d'Alençon
Bruno Wolkowitch as Gilles de Laval
Hélène de Fougerolles as Jeanne de Bar

Releases
In the original version, Jeanne la pucelle I: Les batailles ran for 160 minutes (2:40), and Jeanne la pucelle II: Les prisons ran for 176 minutes (2:56), for a total of 336 minutes (5:36).

The American DVD version had a significant portion cut.  Joan the Maid: The Battles ran for 110 minutes (1:50), and Joan the Maid: The Prisons ran for 116 minutes (1:56), for a total of 226 minutes (3:46).

A 4K restoration of the film was released in August 2019, with a Blu-ray version of the restored film seeing release in December 2019.

Reception
Glenn Kenny calls the film "essential cinema", in which the director (Rivette) "... applies a cinematic style that’s both impassioned and elegantly simple and rational to Joan’s inner and outer life, using long takes and brilliantly considered camera movements throughout."

References

Further reading

External links 
 
 

1994 films
Films directed by Jacques Rivette
Films about Joan of Arc
French historical drama films
1990s French-language films
Films released in separate parts
1990s French films